Kuzov Nunatak is the partly ice-free rocky ridge 2.6 km long in north–south direction, 550 m wide and rising to 590 m on the southwest side of Zagreus Ridge on the Oscar II Coast of the Antarctic Peninsula. It surmounts Green Glacier on the south.

The feature is named after Milan Kuzov (1953–2019), longtime TV director with the Bulgarian National Television and co-founder of the Bulgarian Antarctic Institute, for his contribution to the promotion of Antarctica and support for the Bulgarian Antarctic programme.

Location

Maps
 Antarctic Digital Database (ADD). Scale 1:250000 topographic map of Antarctica. Scientific Committee on Antarctic Research (SCAR). Since 1993, regularly upgraded and updated

Notes

References
 Kuzov Nunatak. SCAR Composite Gazetteer of Antarctica
 Bulgarian Antarctic Gazetteer. Antarctic Place-names Commission. (details in Bulgarian, basic data in English)

External links
 Kuzov Nunatak. Adjusted Copernix satellite image

Nunataks of Graham Land
Oscar II Coast
Bulgaria and the Antarctic